Horio (堀尾) is a Japanese surname. Notable people with the surname include:

, Japanese warlord 
, Japanese warlord 
, Japanese warlord

See also
 Halki (Greece) (Horio or Chorio), Greek village in the island of Halki
 Horio, Othonoi island, Greece

Japanese-language surnames

Anime / Manga
Horio Satoshi - Prince of tennis